Kingsbridge is a market town and tourist hub in the South Hams district of Devon, England.

Kingsbridge or King's Bridge may also refer to:

Places

United Kingdom
 Kingsbridge, Somerset, England
 Kingsbridge, Swansea, Wales
 Kingsbridge (electoral ward), in the City and County of Swansea
 Kingsbridge Hundred, an administrative hundred in Wiltshire, England
 King's Bridge, Belfast, a bridge across the River Lagan in Belfast, Northern Ireland
 King's Bridge, Glasgow, a 1933 bridge in Glasgow, Scotland

United States
 Kingsbridge, Bronx, New York, a neighborhood
 Kingsbridge Armory
 Kingsbridge Heights, Bronx, New York, a neighborhood
 Kingsbridge, Wisconsin, an unincorporated community
 King's Bridge (Pennsylvania), a bridge in Pennsylvania

Elsewhere
 Kingsbridge, Ontario, Canada
 Kingsbridge Wind Power Project, Ontario, Canada
 King's Bridge (Launceston), a bridge in Launceston, Tasmania, Australia
 Kingsbridge Station, original name of Heuston railway station, Dublin, Ireland

Fiction
 Kingsbridge, a fictional town in the Ken Follett novels The Pillars of the Earth and sequels

See also
 Kingbridge Centre, conference centre in Canada